Aryeh Leib ben Moses Zuenz (–1833) was a rabbi and scholar of the 18th and 19th centuries who lived in Pińczów, and later in Plotzk. He was the author of the following works:
 Ya'alat Chen (Zolkiev, 1802), sermons on different parashiyyot
 Get Mekushshar (Warsaw, 1812), compendium to that part of Maimonides' Yad which treats of divorce
 Magen ha-Elef, called also Shem Chadash (ib. 1817), on the regulations of the ritual codex referring to the Passover festival (to this work are appended notes on the Machatzit ha-Shekel of Samuel ha-Levi Kolin)
 She'elot u-Teshubot Gur Aryeh Yehudah (Zolkiev, 1827), compendium of the four ritual codices:
 Chiddushim (Warsaw, 1830), treating of the shechitah and terefah
 Simchat Yom-Tob (ib. 1841), complete commentary on the tractate Betzah
 She'elot u-Teshubot Meshibat Nefesh (ib. 1849), responsa on the ritual codices
 Chiddushim (ib. 1859), compendium of the ritual codex Yoreh De'ah
 Birkat ha-Shir, a Passover Haggadah together with commentary
 Melo ha-'Omer, commentary on the Pentateuch and the Five Megillot
 Tib Chalitzah and Tib Kiddushin, collections of responsa on the ceremony of chalitzah as observed in modern times, and on marriage contracts.

Jewish Encyclopedia bibliography

Fürst, Bibl. Jud. s.v. "Zinz";
Benjacob, Otzar ha-Sefarim, pp. 94, 96, 175, 208, 227, 296, 376, 591, 592, 594, 636.

19th-century Polish rabbis
1760s births
1833 deaths
18th-century Polish rabbis
18th-century Polish–Lithuanian writers
19th-century Polish writers
Year of birth uncertain
People from Płock
People from Pińczów County
Polish non-fiction writers
Polish male non-fiction writers